John Dallachy (c. 1808 – 4 June 1871) was a curator of Melbourne Botanic Gardens and a plant collector.

Dallachy was born in Elginshire, Scotland. He worked as a gardener for the Earl of Aberdeen and Kew Gardens. In 1847, he went to Ceylon to manage a coffee plantation. Sailing to Australia in 1848, he took up work as a gardener for Jonathan Were in Brighton, Victoria.  He was an overseer and later a superintendent of the Melbourne Botanic Gardens from 1849 to 1857. Following the appointment of Ferdinand von Mueller as director, Dallachy continued as curator until 1861.

Expeditions
From 1849 onwards, Dallachy made a number of expeditions (mainly within  Victoria) to collect plant specimens. These included:
c. 1849  Baw Baw region, (Victoria)
August 1849   Mount Macedon, (Victoria)
January 1850  Mount Disappointment,  (Victoria)
August 1850 Pentland Hills, (Victoria)
1853 Ovens Valley and Mount Buffalo,  (Victoria)
1858 Wentworth and Mount Murchison, near Wilcannia,  (New South Wales)
1860 Wimmera River and Lake Hindmarsh, (Victoria)
1864–1871 Rockingham Bay, Queensland

His plant specimens are located in National Herbarium of Victoria| (MEL), with duplicates in the herbaria London (BM), Berlin (B), Kiel (KIEL) and Vienna (W).

References

19th-century Australian botanists
Scottish botanists
1808 births
1871 deaths